Gavin Andrew Collins (born 31 December 1966) is a British Anglican bishop. He has been Bishop of Dorchester, an area bishop in the Diocese of Oxford, since 14 April 2021. From 2011 to 2021, he had been Archdeacon of The Meon in the Diocese of Portsmouth in Hampshire.

Early life and education
Collins was born on 31 December 1966, and grew up in Sussex, England. He was educated at Sackville School, a comprehensive school in East Grinstead. He read law at Trinity Hall, Cambridge, graduating with a Bachelor of Arts (BA) degree in 1989, automatically progressing to a Master of Arts (MA Cantab) in 1993. While at Cambridge University, he served as prayer secretary of the Cambridge Inter-Collegiate Christian Union.

Having attended the College of Law, Guildford, he qualified as a solicitor and worked in the City of London.  He left his legal career to train for ordination at Trinity College, Bristol, an evangelical Anglican theological college. He graduated with another BA in 1996 and a postgraduate Master of Arts (MA) degree in 1997.

Ordained ministry
Collins was ordained in the Church of England as a deacon in 1997 and as a priest in 1998. He served his curacy at St Barnabas, Cambridge from 1997 to 2002. From 2002 to 2011, Vicar of Christ Church, Chorleywood, a conservative evangelical church in the Diocese of St Albans. He was additionally rural dean of Rickmansworth from 2006 to 2011. In 2009, he became an honorary canon of St Albans Cathedral. On 11 September 2011, Collins was collated as the second Archdeacon of The Meon at Portsmouth Cathedral.

Collins has been a member of the General Synod of the Church of England since 2013. He is one of the convenors of the Evangelical Forum, an open evangelical addition to the Synods' evangelical groupings. He contributed a chapter to Journeys in Grace and Truth: Revisiting Scripture and Sexuality, a book of essays from Anglican evangelicals who hold a positive view of same-sex relationships.

Episcopal ministry
Collins's appointment as the next Bishop of Dorchester, the area bishop for the whole county of Oxfordshire outside the cathedral city itself, was announced in November 2020. Due to the COVID-19 pandemic, his consecration as a bishop was postponed from 28 January, and instead he was licensed as episcopal vicar for the area ad interim; a role more common in the Roman Catholic Church and almost unique in the Church of England. His consecration was planned for 12 April, but because of the death of Prince Philip, Duke of Edinburgh that weekend, the service was held privately at Lambeth Palace on 14 April 2021 with a limited congregation under COVID restrictions, and it was not live-streamed. He was consecrated a bishop by Sarah Mullally, Bishop of London, in a service which began at 9:45am.

Views
In November 2022, Collins endorsed Steven Croft's call that clergy in the Church of England should be free to bless or marry same-sex partners and to enter into a same-sex marriage themselves; this is in contrast to the Church's current official position.

Family
He is married to Christina and they have three children. He has a twin brother who is an Elder in the Baptist Church and a sister who is a Methodist Lay preacher.

Selected works

Styles
The Reverend Gavin Collins (1998–2009 & 2021–present)
The Reverend Canon Gavin Collins (2009–2010)
The Venerable Gavin Collins (2011–2021)
The Right Reverend Gavin Collins (2021–present)

References

1966 births
Living people
Alumni of Trinity Hall, Cambridge
Archdeacons of the Meon
Anglican bishops of Dorchester
Evangelical Anglican clergy
Alumni of Trinity College, Bristol
British solicitors
Alumni of The University of Law
Members of the General Synod of the Church of England